Nils Mattias Joacim Asper (born 20 March 1974) is a Swedish former professional footballer who played as a goalkeeper. Starting off his career with Mjällby AIF in the mid-1990s, he went on to play professionally in Spain, Turkey, and Norway before returning to Mjällby in 2008. A full international between 1999 and 2002, he won three caps for the Sweden national football team and was a squad member for them at UEFA Euro 2000.

Club career 

Asper was the first choice goalkeeper for Mjällby AIF in four seasons before signing to the Allsvenskan side AIK in 1998. Lee Baxter began the 1998 season as the first choice. But after seven games AIK had only managed to collect seven points, including only one win. On the 8 of June, Asper made his debut against Östers IF putting Lee Baxter on the bench, which would last for the rest of the season. With Asper in the net, AIK did not lose a single game in the 1998 season and they also won Allsvenskan the same year.

In 1999, AIK qualified for Champions League making it all the way to the group stage. This year, Asper held a clean sheet for 797 minutes in Allsvenskan which was a new record.

His performances in AIK attracted interest from Spanish club Real Sociedad, who bought him just before the 2000-01 season. However, he did not have much of a success in Spain and eventually returned to Sweden and Malmö FF in 2002, after being on loan to Beşiktaş J.K. He won the Swedish championship with Malmö FF in 2004.

He announced his retirement on 26 November 2014.

International career 
Asper made his international debut for Sweden on 27 November 1999 in a friendly game away against South Africa, replacing Magnus Kihlstedt at halftime. He made his second appearance for Sweden on 29 March 2000 in a friendly game away against Austria. He was selected for Sweden's UEFA Euro 2000 squad, and served as third-choice goalkeeper behind Magnus Hedman and Magnus Kihlstedt as Sweden was eliminated after the group stage. He won his third and last international cap in a friendly game against Russia away on 21 August 2002.

Honours
AIK
Allsvenskan: 1998
Svenska Cupen: 1998–99
Malmö FF
Allsvenskan: 2004
Individual
Swedish Goalkeeper of the Year: 1998, 1999

References

External links
Voetbal International profile 
Mjällby AIF profile 
 

1974 births
Living people
Association football goalkeepers
People from Sölvesborg Municipality
Swedish footballers
Mjällby AIF players
AIK Fotboll players
Malmö FF players
IF Brommapojkarna players
Viking FK players
Allsvenskan players
Eliteserien players
La Liga players
Real Sociedad footballers
Sweden international footballers
UEFA Euro 2000 players
Swedish expatriate footballers
Swedish expatriate sportspeople in Spain
Expatriate footballers in Spain
Swedish expatriate sportspeople in Turkey
Expatriate footballers in Turkey
Expatriate footballers in Norway
Swedish expatriate sportspeople in Norway
Süper Lig players
Beşiktaş J.K. footballers
People named in the Panama Papers
Sportspeople from Blekinge County